Robert L. Cowles III (born July 31, 1950) is a Republican member of the Wisconsin Senate, representing the 2nd District since 1987. In August 2011, Cowles faced a recall election, but defeated the Democratic challenger, Nancy Nusbaum, 60 percent to 40 percent.

Early life and education
Cowles was born in Green Bay, Wisconsin. He graduated from the University of Wisconsin–Green Bay in 1975. He was formerly a director of an alternative energy division for a communications construction company.

Political career

Elections
Cowles was elected to the Wisconsin State Assembly in 1982 and re-elected until 1986 when he resigned to run for the state Senate. He was first elected to the Wisconsin State Senate in a special election in April 1987. He ran unopposed in 2008 and 2012, and beat his opponent 65 percent to 35 percent in 2016.

Recall effort

Cowles supported Governor Walker's budget repair bill, including the section that removed collective bargaining. As a result, Cowles was subject to a recall effort as part of the 2011 Wisconsin protests. On March 2, 2011, the "Committee to Recall Cowles" registered with the Wisconsin Government Accountability Board. On April 28, roughly 26,000 signatures to recall Cowles were filed with the Government Accountability Board. In late May 2011, the Wisconsin Government Accountability Board verified petitions against Cowles. The recall election was held on August 9, 2011, with Cowles defeating the Democratic challenger, Nancy Nusbaum, 60 percent to 40 percent.

Committee assignments
Cowles chairs the Senate Committee on Natural Resources and Energy, Co-Chairs the Joint Committee on Audit, sits on the Senate Committee on Transportation and Veterans Affairs, and is the Ranking Member on the Joint Committee on Information Policy and Technology.

Electoral history

Wisconsin Assembly (1982-1986)

| colspan="6" style="text-align:center;background-color: #e9e9e9;"| Primary Election, September 14, 1982

| colspan="6" style="text-align:center;background-color: #e9e9e9;"| General Election, November 2, 1982

| colspan="6" style="text-align:center;background-color: #e9e9e9;"| Primary Election, September 11, 1984

| colspan="6" style="text-align:center;background-color: #e9e9e9;"| General Election, November 6, 1984

| colspan="6" style="text-align:center;background-color: #e9e9e9;"| Primary Election, September 9, 1986

| colspan="6" style="text-align:center;background-color: #e9e9e9;"| General Election, November 4, 1986

Wisconsin Senate (1987-2016)

| colspan="6" style="text-align:center;background-color: #e9e9e9;"| Primary Election, February 17, 1987

| colspan="6" style="text-align:center;background-color: #e9e9e9;"| General Election, April 7, 1987

| colspan="6" style="text-align:center;background-color: #e9e9e9;"| Primary Election, September 13, 1988

| colspan="6" style="text-align:center;background-color: #e9e9e9;"| General Election, November 8, 1988

| colspan="6" style="text-align:center;background-color: #e9e9e9;"| Primary Election, September 8, 1992

| colspan="6" style="text-align:center;background-color: #e9e9e9;"| General Election, November 3, 1992

| colspan="6" style="text-align:center;background-color: #e9e9e9;"| Primary Election, September 10, 1996

| colspan="6" style="text-align:center;background-color: #e9e9e9;"| General Election, November 5, 1996

| colspan="6" style="text-align:center;background-color: #e9e9e9;"| Primary Election, September 12, 2000

| colspan="6" style="text-align:center;background-color: #e9e9e9;"| General Election, November 7, 2000

| colspan="6" style="text-align:center;background-color: #e9e9e9;"| Primary Election, September 14, 2004

| colspan="6" style="text-align:center;background-color: #e9e9e9;"| General Election, November 2, 2004

| colspan="6" style="text-align:center;background-color: #e9e9e9;"| Primary Election, September 9, 2008

| colspan="6" style="text-align:center;background-color: #e9e9e9;"| General Election, November 4, 2008

| colspan="6" style="text-align:center;background-color: #e9e9e9;"| Primary Election, July 12, 2011

| colspan="6" style="text-align:center;background-color: #e9e9e9;"| General Election, August 9, 2011

| colspan="6" style="text-align:center;background-color: #e9e9e9;"| Primary Election, August 14, 2012

| colspan="6" style="text-align:center;background-color: #e9e9e9;"| General Election, November 6, 2012

| colspan="6" style="text-align:center;background-color: #e9e9e9;"| Primary Election, August 9, 2016

| colspan="6" style="text-align:center;background-color: #e9e9e9;"| General Election, November 8, 2016

References

External links 
 Official legislative website
 Voting record and bills authored website
 Campaign website

1950 births
American Episcopalians
Living people
Republican Party members of the Wisconsin State Assembly
Politicians from Green Bay, Wisconsin
University of Wisconsin–Green Bay alumni
Republican Party Wisconsin state senators
21st-century American politicians